Colonel James Fellowes  (21 August 1841 – 3 May 1916) was an English soldier and amateur cricketer. Fellowes served in the Royal Engineers and played first-class cricket for Kent County Cricket Club and Hampshire County Cricket Club. He was a right-handed who bowled right-arm fast roundarm.

Military career
Fellowes was born in the Cape of Good Hope in South Africa in 1841. He joined the Royal Engineers and was commissioned in the Corps. He reached the rank of Colonel and served as Assistant-Commandant of the Royal School of Military Engineering at Chatham in Kent. In 1890 Fellowes retired from the army on half-pay.

Cricket career
Fellowes first played cricket for the Royal Engineers Cricket Club in 1868 and joined the MCC in 1869. He made his first-class cricket debut for MCC against Cambridge University in 1870.

Fellowes made his county cricket debut for Kent County Cricket Club in 1873. He played nine first-class matches for Kent up until 1881 before going on to play eleven times for Hampshire County Cricket Club between 1883 and 1885. In his first-class career Fellowes took a total of 60 wickets at an average of 18.96, including taking 13/100 for Kent against Lancashire in 1874. He was described in Scores and Biographies as "a very hard hitter, and a fast round-armed bowler" who could field at "any place with effect".

The majority of his non-first-class games for the Royal Engineers, making over 50 appearances for the Corps. He made appearances for a number of other teams, including Devon County Cricket Club and the Army team. Fellowes was the co-secretary of Hampshire between 1883 and 1886 and was involved in founding the Hampshire Hogs and Devon Dumplings clubs.

Later life
He was employed by the Ordnance Survey in Southampton and in March 1883 was elected a Fellow of the Royal Astronomical Society. His daughter Anna, married Walter Coote Hedley who also served in the Royal Engineers and later joined the Ordnance Survey. Fellowes died in Castle House in Dedham, Essex on 3 May 1916 aged 74. He is buried in the churchyard of St John the Evangelist at Hale, Surrey.

References

External links

1841 births
1916 deaths
English cricketers
Marylebone Cricket Club cricketers
Kent cricketers
Hampshire cricketers
English cricket administrators
Royal Engineers officers
Fellows of the Royal Astronomical Society
19th-century British businesspeople
Burials in Surrey